Kin Yang Academy (abbreviated KYA) is a coeducational private school located in the city of Dasmariñas, province of Cavite, Philippines.  The school offers elementary and secondary level of education.

History
Kin Yang Academy was founded by Leodencio T. Obra and his wife Reny C. Obra in February 2000.

On the year 2013. Kin Yang Academy has a branch located in Sariaya, Quezon Province.

Physical location
The school campus is located inside the Goldenville Subdivision II (Blk. 8 Lot 2 Pes-1st) in Brgy. Sabang in Dasmariñas, near the boundary with the city of Imus in the province of Cavite.

Gallery

References

External links
Kin Yang Academy in Facebook

Schools in Dasmariñas
High schools in Cavite